is a Japanese manga written and illustrated by Yugi Yamada. It was serialised in Hanaoto magazine and collected into a bound volume by Houbunsha in 2002. It is licensed in North America by Digital Manga Publishing, which released the manga through its June imprint, on 24 February 2010.

Reception
Leroy Douresseaux, writing for Comic Book Bin, enjoyed the characterisation, saying "there is as much action going on in [the] character's heads as there is action on the page", and described the manga as an "engaging read".

Katherine Farmar, writing for Manga Village, noted Yamada's method of taking the BL cliche of the "childhood-crush-all-grown-up" and making it "less sentimental and more realistic", feeling it had "substance", and that the genres were "a delightful blend of romance, comedy, and very low-key thriller".

References

External links
 

Yaoi anime and manga
Houbunsha manga
Digital Manga Publishing titles